Luis Antonio Macias Lozano is a retired Mexican professional football defender who played in the USL A-League.

Career

From 1996 to 1999, Macias played for Atlético San Francisco in Mexico. In 2001, he moved to the El Paso Patriots in the USL A-League.  The Patriots sent Macias on loan to Zacatepec in January 2002.

References

Living people
1972 births
El Paso Patriots players
Mexican expatriate footballers
Mexican footballers
A-League (1995–2004) players
Club Atlético Zacatepec players
Footballers from Guanajuato
Sportspeople from León, Guanajuato
Association football forwards
Association football midfielders